Cyanothamnus polygalifolius, commonly known as dwarf boronia, milkwort-leaved boronia or milkwort boronia, is a plant in the citrus family Rutaceae and is endemic to eastern Australia. It is a low-lying shrub with simple leaves and white or pink flowers arranged singly or in groups of up to three in leaf axils.

Description
The plant is glabrous, apart from the flowers . The eight stamens have hairy edges.

Taxonomy and naming
This species was first formally described in 1798 by James Edward Smith who gave it the nameBoronia polygalifolia in his book ''Tracts relating to natural history. In a 2013 paper in the journal Taxon, Marco Duretto and others changed the name to Cyanothamnus polygalifolius on the basis of cladistic analysis. The specific epithet (polygalifolius) is a reference to the similarity of the leaves of this species to those in the genus Polygala.

Distribution and habitat
Dwarf boronia grows in open forest, woodland and heath between the Blackdown Tableland and Kroombit Tops in Queensland and Moruya and Geehi in New South Wales. A single specimen has been recorded in eastern Victoria.

References

polygalifolius
Flora of New South Wales
Plants described in 1798
Taxa named by James Edward Smith